Hot Boy, Hot Boys or Hot Boyz may refer to:

Hot Boy
Hot Boy (film), an alternative title for Lost in Paradise, a 2011 Vietnamese film
"Hot Boy" (song), the clean version of the Bobby Shmurda song "Hot N*gga"

Hot Boys
Hot Boys, often styled as Hot Boy$, an American hip hop group from 1996 to 2001 then reformed in 2007

Hot Boyz
Hot Boyz (film), a 2000 action crime film written and directed by Master P
"Hot Boyz" (song)", a song by rapper Missy "Misdemeanor" Elliott featuring Lil' Mo

See also
"Still a Hot Boy", a 2005 album released by rapper Turk
Hotboii, American rapper